The Karay-a are a Visayan ethnic group native to the islands of Panay and Palawan in the Philippines. They speak the Karay-a language.

Etymology
The ethnonym Karay-a was derived from the word iraya, which means "upstream". The term , literally "of Antique", is incorrectly used as a synonym of Karay-a; however, it properly refers to registered residents of the province of Antique irrespective of ethnicity.

Area

Antique
Anini-y
Tobias Fornier
Hamtic
San Jose
Belison
Sibalom
San Remigio
Patnongon
Bugasong
Valderrama
Laua-an
Barbaza
Tibiao
Culasi
Sebaste
Pandan
Libertad
Caluya

Iloilo
Alimodian
Leon
San Miguel
San Enrique
Santa Barbara
San Joaquin
Bingawan
Calinog
Lambunao
Passi City
San Rafael
Badiangan
Janiuay
Zarraga
Cabatuan
Maasin
New Lucena
Mina
Pototan
Tubungan
Oton
Dueñas
Tigbauan
Igbaras
Guimbal
Miag-ao
Dingle

Capiz
Tapaz
Jamindan
Dumarao
Dumalag

Aklan
Nabas
Buruanga
Malay
Libacao
Madalag
Ibajay
Tangalan
Makato
Malinao

Palawan
Taytay
Narra
El Nido
Cagayancillo

Demographics
The Karay-a number 363,000 in 2021 . They were first believed to be the descendants of immigrants from Borneo, through the epic-myth of the "Ten Bornean Datus". Recent findings, however, revealed that the ancestors of the Karay-a are the Austronesian-speaking immigrants who came from South China during the Iron Age. They primarily speak Karay-a. Meanwhile, Hiligaynon, Tagalog, and English are used as second languages. Most are Christians. About 80% are Roman Catholics, and the rest are Protestants. Some people belonging to the Suludnon tribe, are animists.
As of 2015, there are about 1,300,000 Karay-a speakers all over the country. About 45% from Antique province, 38% from Iloilo and 7% in Mindanao specifically Sultan Kudarat and North Cotabato.

Culture
Most Karay-a engage in agriculture, as well as in cottage industries. Several towns in Antique have the distinction of producing quality ware ranging from salakot and sawali from Belison, bamboo-craft from San Jose, ceramics from Sibalom, pottery from Bandoja, Tibiao; mats from Pandan and Libertad; and loom-woven patadyong (barrel skirt) from Bagtason, Bugasong, the only one of its kind in the Visayas and well known throughout Panay. Music, such as courtship songs, wedding hymns, and funeral recitals, is well-developed, as it is with dance.

Indigenous Karay-a Religion

Immortals

Maka-ako: the supreme deity residing on the uppermost level of the cosmic universe's seven layers
Alunsina: the mother goddess of the Hinilawod epic heroes; aided in the battle against Saragnayon
Laonsina: a sky goddess and grandmother of Nagmalitung Yawa
Unnamed Sky God: a sky god who prevented Balanakon from traveling to Labaw Donggon's territory
Tagna-an: the creator god and a busalian shaman; the most powerful and versatile of all ma-aram shamans
Hugna-an: the first man; a ma-aram shaman and child of Tagna-an
Humihinahon: the first woman; a ma-aram shaman and child of Tagna-an
Kapapu-an: the pantheon of ancestral spirits from whom the supernatural powers of shamans originated from; their aid enables specific types of shamans to gush water from rocks, leap far distances, create oil shields, become invisible, or pass through solid matter
Papu Estrella Bangotbanwa: a deified shaman who controlled the forces of nature
Sidapa: god who establishes a person's lifespan through a very tall tree on Mount Madia-as
Pandaque: god who allows the souls of the dead to enter Mount Madya-as, the home of the dead, if a proper mag-anito ritual is held
Simuran: a god who takes the souls to the lower regions
Siginarugan: a god who takes the souls to the lower regions
Bangle: carries the non-liquefied soul across the water; the way he carries the soul differs depending on the soul's answers to his questions
Bagubu: deity of the stream which follows after the crossing with Bangle

Mortals

Labaw Donggon: an epic hero who journeyed to many lands
Gimbitinan: a wife of Labaw Donggon; mother of the hero Asu Mangga
Anggoy Doronoon: a wife of Labaw Donggon; mother of the hero Buyung Baranugun
Yawa Sinagmaling: the wife of the lord, Saragnayon; Labaw Donggon fell in love with her, leading to the battle between Labaw Donggon and Saragnayon
Saragnayon: husband of Yawa Sinagmaling; became a mortal after the wild boar which safeguards his immortality was defeated
Asu Mangga: hero son of Gimbitinan and Labaw Donggon; fought Saragnayon for the release of his father
Buyung Baranugun: hero son of Anggoy Doronoon and Labaw Donggon; fought Saragnayon for the release of his father
Humadapnon: an epic hero; brother of Labaw Donggon and husband of Nagmalitung Yawa; aided by an enchanted tree and three messengers birds in the courting of Nagmaliyung Yawa
Nagmalitung Yawa: a powerful binukot who rescued her husband by transforming herself into a man named Buyung Sunmasakay; defeated the thousand army in Tarangban; when her mother Matan-ayon was in old age, a ritual was conducted where Nagmalitung Yawa found out about Humadapnon's promiscuity; Matan-ayon's powers were transferred to her, and she ascended into heaven with the aid of her grandmother Laonsina
Malubay Hanginon: a powerful binukot who captured and imprisoned by Humadapnon; defeated by Nagmalitung Yawa under her male form
Paglambuhan: a warrior who was keeping the Timpara Alimuon sacred boat in his fortress; defeated by Nagmalitung Yawa, Humadapnon, and Dumalapdap
Matan-ayon: mother of Nagmalitung Yawa; thinking that Humadapnon has died, makes Nagmalitung Yawa pregnant to compel to her marriage with the revived Paglambuhan; Humadapnon later kills the couple, but is reunited with the revived Nagmalitung Yawa; in the Sugidanon epic, she married the reluctant Labaw Donggon
Dumalapdap: an epic hero; brother of Labaw Donggon
Tikim Kadlum: an enchanted dog that rouses the ire of the monster Makabagting
Datu Paiburong: owner of Tikim Kadlum
Amburukay: married to Labaw Donggon after she consented her golden pubic hair to be used in Labaw Donggon's kudyapi
Pahagunon: an underworld being who abducts one of Labaw Donggon's wife, Ayon
Ayon: abducted by Pahagunon after Labaw Donggon transformed into a sea turtle
Giant Crab Master: a master who has a giant crab follower, who aids in the abduction of one of Labaw Donggon's wives; his loyal crab can transform into an island with betel-nut trees
Sanagnayan: a being whose life-force is in an egg in a lion's heart; the sister of Matan-ayon is rescued by Labaw Donggon from Sanagnayan
Balanakon: prevented by the god of the sky from sailing into Labaw Donggon's territory, resulting in a long-drawn battle

References